The Comet is a single handed, one design racing dinghy available with three separate rigging options: Standard, Xtra and Mino, that can be raced competitively alongside each other.  It is mainly sailed in the United Kingdom at club level and at open meetings organised by the Comet Class Association. The Comet is a recognised RYA dinghy class.

Specifications
The Comet has a large uncluttered cockpit, rear mainsheet (with centre mainsheet permitted under class rules) and an unbattened sail with a sleeve luff on an unstayed rig.  The hull and deck is manufactured from glass-reinforced plastic and available in a number of colour combinations.

The mast is in two sections and is loose footed like the Laser rig.

Latest sail number: 880

Rigging options
 Standard: 
 Xtra (Mylar Sail):  and a 570 mm shorter mast.
 Mino:  and a 570 mm shorter mast. PYN 1193

References

External links
Comet Class Association
Comet Dinghies (Builder's Site)
RYA clubs with Comet fleets

Dinghies